The 2021–22 UEFA Women's Champions League was the 21st edition of the European women's club football championship organised by UEFA, and the 13th edition since being rebranded as the UEFA Women's Champions League. It was the first edition to feature a 16-team group stage.

The final was held at the Juventus Stadium in Turin, Italy. The winners of the 2021–22 UEFA Women's Champions League automatically qualified for the 2022–23 UEFA Women's Champions League group stage.

The video assistant referee (VAR), previously only deployed for the final, was used for all matches in the knockout stage.

On 24 June 2021, UEFA approved the proposal to abolish the away goals rule in all UEFA club competitions, which had been used since 1965. Therefore, if in a two-legged tie, two teams scored the same amount of aggregate goals, the winner of tie was not decided by the number of away goals scored by each team, but always by 30 minutes of extra time, and if the two teams scored the same amount of goals in extra time, the winner was decided by a penalty shoot-out.

Barcelona were the defending champions, but lost the final to Lyon, who won a record eighth title.

Association team allocation
The association ranking based on the UEFA women's country coefficients is used to determine the number of participating teams for each association:
Associations 1–6 each have three teams qualify.
Associations 7–16 each have two teams qualify.
All other associations, if they entered, each have one team qualify.
The winners of the 2020–21 UEFA Women's Champions League are given an additional entry if they do not qualify for the 2021–22 UEFA Women's Champions League through their domestic league. However, the title holders have qualified through their domestic league, meaning the additional entry is not necessary for this season.

An association must have an eleven-a-side women's domestic league to enter a team. As of 2019–20, 52 of the 55 UEFA member associations organize a women's domestic league, with the exceptions being Andorra, Liechtenstein and San Marino.

Association ranking
For the 2021–22 UEFA Women's Champions League, the associations are allocated places according to their 2020 UEFA women's Association coefficients, which takes into account their performance in European competitions from 2015-16 to 2019–20.

Notes

NR – No rank (association did not enter in any of the seasons used for computing coefficients)
DNE – Did not enter
NL – No women's domestic league

Distribution
Unlike the men's Champions League, not every association entered a team, and so the exact number of teams entering in each round could not be determined until the full entry list was known. If there were more than 47 teams in the Champions Path qualifying, a preliminary round of two-legged home-and-away matches would have been played by the champions from the lowest-ranked associations. For example, if the title holders had not qualified for the group stage through league position and all 52 associations with a women's domestic league entered, the champions from associations 49–52 would enter the preliminary round. However, only 50 associations entered and this round was skipped.

The following is the access list for this season. As the Champions League title holders, Barcelona, which were guaranteed a berth in the Champions League group stage, already qualified via their domestic league, the following changes to the access list were made:
The champions of association 4 (England) entered the group stage instead of round 2.
The champions of association 7 (Denmark) entered round 2 instead of round 1.
The champions of association 49 (Luxembourg) and 50 (Armenia) entered round 1 instead of the preliminary round, which was skipped.

Teams
The labels in the parentheses show how each team qualified for the place of its starting round:
TH: Title holders
1st, 2nd, 3rd: League positions of the previous season
Abd-: League positions of abandoned season due to the COVID-19 pandemic in Europe as determined by the national association; all teams are subject to approval by UEFA as per the guidelines for entry to European competitions in response to the COVID-19 pandemic

The two qualifying rounds, round 1 and round 2, are divided into Champions Path (CP) and League Path (LP).

CC: 2021 UEFA women's club coefficients.

Notes

Schedule
The schedule of the competition was as follows.

Qualifying rounds

A preliminary round consisting of two-legged home-and-away matches would have been played by the champions from the lowest-ranked associations if more than 50 associations had entered the tournament and the title holders had not qualified through league position. Since only 50 associations entered, this round was skipped.

Round 1

Champions Path
Tournament 1

Tournament 2

Tournament 3

Tournament 4

Tournament 5

Tournament 6

Tournament 7

Tournament 8

Tournament 9

Tournament 10

Tournament 11

League Path
Tournament 1

Tournament 2

Tournament 3

Tournament 4

Round 2

Group stage

The draw for the group stage was held on 13 September 2021, 13:00 CEST, in Nyon. The 16 teams were drawn into four groups of four. For the draw, the teams were seeded into four pots, each of four teams, based on the following principles:
Pot 1 contained the four direct entrants, i.e., the Champions League holders and the champions of the top three associations based on their 2020 UEFA women's country coefficients.
Pot 2, 3 and 4 contained the remaining teams, seeded based on their 2021 UEFA women's club coefficients.
Teams from the same association could not be drawn into the same group. Prior to the draw, UEFA formed one pairing of teams for associations with two or three teams based on television audiences, where one team was drawn into Groups A–B and another team into Groups C–D, so that the two teams played on different days. Clubs from countries with severe winter conditions (Sweden, Iceland) were assigned a position in their group which allowed them to play away on matchday 6.

The matches were played on 5–6 October, 13–14 October, 9–10 November, 17–18 November, 8–9 December, and 15–16 December 2021. The top two teams of each group advanced to the quarter-finals.

Køge, 1899 Hoffenheim and Real Madrid played in a European competition for the first time this season.

Group A

Group B

Group C

Group D

Knockout phase
In the knockout phase, teams played against each other over two legs on a home-and-away basis, except for the one-match final. The mechanism of the draws for each round was as follows:

 In the draw for the quarter-finals, the four group winners were seeded, and the four group runners-up were unseeded. The seeded teams were drawn against the unseeded teams, with the seeded teams hosting the second leg. Teams from the same group could not be drawn against each other.
 A draw was also held to determine which semi-final winner was designated as the "home" team for the final (for administrative purposes as it was played at a neutral venue).

Bracket

Quarter-finals

Semi-finals

Final

Statistics
Statistics exclude qualifying rounds and play-off round.

Top goalscorers

Top assists

Squad of the season
The UEFA technical study group selected the following players as the squad of the tournament.

Player of the season
  Alexia Putellas ( Barcelona)

Young player of the season
  Selma Bacha ( Lyon)

See also
2021–22 UEFA Champions League

References

External links

Women's Domestic Leagues, UEFA.com

 
2021–22
Women's Champions League
2021 in women's association football
2022 in women's association football